Luogang is a town under the jurisdiction of Xingning City, Meizhou, in eastern Guangdong Province, China.

References 

Township-level divisions of Guangdong